The Church of All Saints also known as Holy Cross Church, is  a cemetery church in Munich, southern Germany. 

The church was built in 1478 by Jörg von Halsbach and was the first church with a cemetery in the St. Peter parish. It was once located at the crossing of four roads, whence the original suffix am Kreuz ("at the Cross"). 

It has unadorned brickwork walls, Gothicvaults and a tall bell tower. The interior was rebuilt from 1620 in Baroque style, the only remaining Gothic elements being the nave's vault, fragments of a fresco and a Crucifix by Hans Leinberger. The tomb of banker   Gietz and the Apparition of the Virgin to St. Augustine (by Hans Rottenhammer) are in Mannerist style.

References

External links 
 muenchen.de: Allerheiligenkirche
 Photo spread of Allerheiligenkirche / All Saints Catholic Church

Roman Catholic churches in Munich
Baroque architecture in Bavaria
Gothic architecture in Munich
Cultural heritage monuments in Munich